Joyce Sherman Buñuel (born October 20, 1941) is a French director and screenwriter of American origin.

Biography
Joyce Sherman was born on October 20, 1941 in Brooklyn, New York, into a family of Jewish emigrants who came from Russia in 1914. She told Le Monde in 1990, “You've seen Radio Days, by Woody Allen, it was exactly that! I can't say it any better! That was my house, the unmarried woman, she was my aunt! The street that overlooks the sea, the neighbors, the school, the parents, the football, the baseball, all that was my life!" Her father, a Menshevik, fought in the International Brigades during the Spanish Civil War.

Buñuel was married to director Juan Luis Buñuel, the son of Luis Buñuel. The couple lived in Madrid and Mexico City, before moving to Paris in the early 1960s. The couple divorced after she made her first film, La Jument vapeur, in 1976. She had several children from this marriage, including Diego Buñuel.

References

1941 births
Living people
People from Brooklyn
American emigrants to France
French women film directors
French women screenwriters